Melih Kabasakal (born 18 February 1996) is a Turkish professional footballer who plays as a defensive midfielder for TFF First League club Eyüpspor.

Career
Kabasakal is a youth product of the youth academies of Boyabat Çeltikspor, Samsunspor and Trabzonspor. He began his senior career with Trabzonspor in January 2016 where he was promoted to the senior team. He joined Sarıyer on loan for the 2016–17 season, and 1461 Trabzon for 2017–18. He then spent  seasons with Esenler Erokspor, before transferring to İstanbulspor on 30 January 2020 in the TFF First League. He helped İstanbulspor achieve promotion in the 2021–22 season for the first time in 17 years. He made his professional debut in İstanbulspor's return to the Süper Lig in a 2–0 season opening loss to Trabzonspor on 5 August 2022.

On 16 January 2023, Kabasakal joined Eyüpspor on a 3.5-year contract.

International career
Kabasakal is a youth international for Turkey, having played for the Turkey U16s.

References

External links
 

1996 births
Living people
Sportspeople from Samsun
Turkish footballers
Turkey youth international footballers
Trabzonspor footballers
Sarıyer S.K. footballers
1461 Trabzon footballers
İstanbulspor footballers
Eyüpspor footballers
Süper Lig players
TFF First League players
TFF Second League players
TFF Third League players
Association football defenders